Docteur Jekyll et les femmes is a 1981 horror film directed by Walerian Borowczyk. The film is a variation on Robert Louis Stevenson's 1886 novella Strange Case of Dr Jekyll and Mr Hyde and stars Udo Kier, Marina Pierro, Patrick Magee, Howard Vernon, and Gérard Zalcberg.

The film, a co-production between France and West Germany, was released in France in 1981 and won an award for Best Feature Film Director at the 1981 Sitges Film Festival for Borowczyk.

Plot

Fanny Osborne (Marina Pierro) and her mother arrive at the home of Dr. Henry Jekyll (Udo Kier) to celebrate their engagement. The party is attended by numerous dignitaries, including General Carew (Patrick Magee) and his daughter; Dr Lanyon (Howard Vernon), a close friend and mentor to Henry who is nonetheless nonplused by Henry's endorsement of "transcendental science"; Enfield (Eugene Braun Munk), Henry's attorney; and the Reverend (Clément Harari). After dinner, the daughter of a guest is found raped and murdered in a bedroom. In the ensuing investigation, General Carew kills the Osbornes' coachman, thinking he is the culprit. Then someone finds a broken walking stick that used to belong to Henry; it has been used to beat to death a young girl.

Henry informs Enfield that he has named Edward Hyde as his sole heir should he die unexpectedly. When Enfield protests, Henry assures him that Hyde will take care of Fanny and their mothers. When Henry goes to see if he can revive the coachman, an unknown man appears in the Jekyll household and begins to attack the guests. He ties up General Carew and forces him to watch as he ravishes the general's willing daughter, then beheads another guest when he tries to intervene before trapping a young male guest in the attic and raping him.

Henry returns and professes embarrassment and horror that his guests have been assaulted and murdered. He barricades himself in his laboratory, unaware that Fanny has also hidden herself there. She watches as Henry plunges into a bath of unknown chemicals and transforms into his alter ego: Edward Hyde (Gérard Zalcberg). Fanny follows Hyde through the house as he brutalizes the other guests, including forcing Mrs. Jekyll to play the piano until her fingers are numb and killing the Carews with arrows. Seeing Fanny, Hyde tells her that he wants to watch her die, then wounds her with an arrow. But before he can kill her or Mrs. Jekyll, Hyde is interrupted by the gun-wielding Lanyard. He takes Lanyard to Henry's laboratory where he plays him a recording in which Henry pleads with Lanyard to give Hyde a dose of a chemical. Lanyard complies and watches in horror as Hyde transforms into Henry. Lanyard dies of a heart attack.

Henry takes the injured Fanny to his laboratory. He explains that he is not a hypocrite: his Jekyll persona is completely sincere in his generosity and humanity, and Hyde is completely sincere in his hatred and refusal to conform to social expectations. Seemingly addicted to Hyde's freedom, Henry prepares another bath. But before he can enter, Fanny immerses herself. She emerges untransformed physically but possessed of the same contempt for morality. She then pushes Henry in, and he transforms into Hyde.

Together, they kill the rest of the guests and servants and destroy the house--including Henry's notes and books on transcendental science. They then escape in a carriage, having violent sex until they transform back into Fanny and Henry.

Cast
 Udo Kier as Dr. Henry Jekyll 
 Marina Pierro as Fanny Osbourne 
 Patrick Magee as General Carew 
 Gérard Zalcberg as Mr. Edward Hyde 
 Howard Vernon as Dr. Lanyon 
 Clément Harari as Reverend Guest 
 Jean Mylonas as Mr. Utterson 
 Eugene Braun Munk  as Mr. Enfield

Release
Borowczyk wanted to call his film Le cas étrange de Dr.Jekyll et Miss Osbourne but his distributors UGC insisted it be released under the title Docteur Jekyll et les femmes. The film was released in France on June 17, 1981. Docteur Jekyll et les femmes never opened commercially in the United States, and in Britain, it played at one cinema for one week.

The film was released theatrically in the UK under the title The Blood of Dr. Jekyll and then later on video as Bloodlust. On the film's presentation at the Sitges Film Festival, it was shown under the title Docteur Jekyll et Miss Osborne. Arrow Films released the film in both the U.S. and UK on April 21, 2015 on Blu-ray and DVD.  This was the film's first legitimate commercial release in any medium in the U.S. and the first in the UK since the VHS era. Arrow also restored Borowczyk's preferred title The Strange Case of Dr Jekyll and Miss Osbourne.

Reception

The film won Walerian Borowczyk the award for Best Feature Film Director at the 1981 Sitges Film Festival.

See also
 List of French films of 1981
 List of German films of the 1980s
 List of horror films of 1981

Notes

References

External links
 
 

1981 horror films
1981 films
Dr. Jekyll and Mr. Hyde films
Films directed by Walerian Borowczyk
West German films
French horror films
German horror films
1980s French-language films
1980s French films
1980s German films